Lancaster Regional Airport  is two miles south of Lancaster, in Dallas County, Texas. Formerly Lancaster Airport, the National Plan of Integrated Airport Systems for 2011–2015 categorized it as a general aviation reliever airport.

Most U.S. airports use the same three-letter location identifier for the FAA and IATA, but this airport is LNC to the FAA and has no IATA code. (IATA assigned LNC to Lengbati Airport in Lengbati, Papua New Guinea).

Facilities
The airport covers 548 acres (222 ha) at an elevation of 501 feet (153 m). Its single runway, 13/31, is 6,502 by 100 feet (1,982 x 30 m) asphalt.

In the year ending May 3, 2010 the airport had 67,100 aircraft operations, average 183 per day: 99.9% general aviation and 0.1% military. 142 aircraft were then based at this airport: 70% single-engine, 15% multi-engine, 8% jet, 6% helicopter, and 1% glider.

References

External links 

 Lancaster Regional Airport at City of Lancaster website
  at Texas DOT Airport Directory
 Aerial image as of March 1995 from USGS The National Map
 

Airports in Texas
Airports in the Dallas–Fort Worth metroplex
Buildings and structures in Dallas County, Texas
Transportation in Dallas County, Texas